Fred Morton Raymond (March 22, 1876 – February 6, 1946) was a United States district judge of the United States District Court for the Western District of Michigan.

Education and career

Born in Berlin (now Marne), Michigan, Raymond received a Bachelor of Laws from the University of Michigan Law School in 1899. He was in private practice in Grand Rapids, Michigan from 1899 to 1925.

Federal judicial service

Raymond received a recess appointment from President Calvin Coolidge on May 8, 1925, to the United States District Court for the Western District of Michigan, to a new seat authorized by 43 Stat. 949. He was nominated to the same position by President Coolidge on December 8, 1925. He was confirmed by the United States Senate on December 18, 1925, and received his commission the same day. His service terminated on February 6, 1946, due to his death.

References

Sources
 

1876 births
1946 deaths
Judges of the United States District Court for the Western District of Michigan
United States district court judges appointed by Calvin Coolidge
20th-century American judges
People from Ottawa County, Michigan
University of Michigan Law School alumni